This is a list of English football transfers for the 2014 summer transfer window. Only moves featuring at least one Premier League or Championship club are listed.

The summer transfer window began once clubs had concluded their final domestic fixture of the 2013–14 season, but many transfers will only officially go through on 1 July because the majority of player contracts finish on 30 June. The window will remain open until 23:00 BST on 1 September 2014.

This list also includes transfers featuring at least one Premier League or Championship club which were completed after the end of the winter 2013–14 transfer window and before the end of the 2014 summer window.

Players without a club may join at any time, and clubs below Premier League level may sign players on loan during loan windows. Clubs may be permitted to sign a goalkeeper on an emergency loan if they have no registered goalkeeper available.

Transfers

All players, and clubs without a flag are English. Note that while Cardiff City and Swansea City are affiliated with the Football Association of Wales and thus take the Welsh flag, they play in the English football league system, and so their transfers are included here.

 Player officially joined his club when the loan window for Football League clubs re-opened on 8 February.
 Player officially joined his club on 1 July 2014.

Notes

References

Specific

Transfers Summer 2014
Summer 2014
English